Ernest Scared Stupid is a 1991 American comedy horror film directed by John Cherry and starring Jim Varney. It is the fifth film to feature the character Ernest P. Worrell. In the film, Ernest unwittingly unleashes an evil troll upon a small town on Halloween night and helps the local children fight back. It was shot in Nashville, Tennessee like its predecessors Dr. Otto and the Riddle of the Gloom Beam, Ernest Goes to Camp, Ernest Saves Christmas, and Ernest Goes to Jail.

Due to its modest gross of $14,143,280 at the U.S. box office, Disney opted not to continue the franchise, making this the fourth and final Ernest film to be released under the Disney label, Touchstone Pictures. The next film in the series, Ernest Rides Again, was independently distributed, was a box office bomb and was the final Ernest film to be released theatrically. Subsequent Ernest films were made for the straight-to-video market.<ref
 name="AFI"></ref>

Its opening credits feature a montage of clips from various horror and science fiction films, including Nosferatu (1922), White Zombie (1932), Phantom from Space (1953), The Brain from Planet Arous (1957), The Screaming Skull (1958), Missile to the Moon (1958), The Hideous Sun Demon (1958), The Giant Gila Monster (1959), The Killer Shrews (1959), Battle Beyond the Sun (1959), and The Little Shop of Horrors (1960).

Plot
In the late 19th century, the demonic troll Trantor transforms children into wooden dolls to feast upon their energy in Briarville, Missouri. The townsfolk capture him and seal him under an oak tree, with Phineas Worrell, one of the village elders and an ancestor of Ernest P. Worrell, establishing the seal. Trantor vengefully places a curse on the Worrell family, stating that he can only be released on the night before Halloween by a Worrell. As part of the curse, every generation of Worrells will get "dumber and dumber and dumber", until the dumbest member of the family is foolish enough to release him from his earthly prison.

One hundred years later, Ernest, a sanitation worker, helps a few of his middle school friends, Kenny Binder, Elizabeth and Joey, construct a treehouse in the same tree that unknowingly contains the dormant creature, after the mayor's sons demolished their own cardboard haunted house. When Old Lady Hackmore discovers this, she angrily leaves. Following her, Ernest learns the story of Trantor and idiotically reports it to the kids. Inadvertently, Ernest releases the troll. Joey is walking home from the treehouse when he hears something rustling through the trees. Joey slowly walks and slips down in a muddy hole. Trantor grabs Joey's wrist and turns him into a wooden doll. Ernest finds Kenny's dad, Sheriff Cliff Binder, and explains the situation but Binder does not believe him. After none of the townsfolk will assist Ernest because of the upcoming Halloween party, he mounts a one-man (and one-dog) defense operation in preparation for Trantor's appearance. Meanwhile, Trantor captures a boy on a skateboard as his second victim.

Tom and Bobby Tulip, hoping to exploit Ernest, sell him various fake troll traps, but one backfires on the mayor's sons and Ernest loses his job. Ernest, Kenny and Elizabeth return to Hackmore, where they learn that only "the heart of a child, and a mother's care" can defeat the troll. Later that night, Trantor claims Elizabeth as his third victim as he sneaks into her house while she is resting on her bed.

While Kenny and his friend Gregg are walking, Trantor uses Elizabeth's voice to lure Kenny away, then takes Gregg as a fourth victim. Despite parents being upset at their missing children, Mayor Murdock and Sheriff Binder still proceed with a Halloween party at the school, believing the missing children will be there. Trantor appears there and takes the mayor's oldest son as his fifth and final wooden doll. In the ensuing fight between Trantor and Ernest, Trantor turns Ernest's dog Rimshot into a wooden doll before being repelled by soft-serve ice cream on Ernest's hands. Kenny realizes that "mother's care" refers to milk and rallies a troll-fighting team to destroy them.

Back at the treehouse, Trantor successfully summons his army of trolls while Ernest unsuccessfully tries to stop them. The townspeople show up, only for the trolls to overwhelm and beat them up. Kenny and his friends arrive and begin destroying the trolls with milk. During the fight, Trantor escapes beneath the tree where he summons the powers of the underworld, making him invincible, especially to milk. Enraged, Kenny unsuccessfully tries to destroy Trantor, who also turns Kenny into a doll. With the other townsfolk now backing him up and telling him to douse Trantor in milk, Ernest realizes that milk weakened the troll children, while unconditional love ("the heart of a child") would weaken Trantor himself. He takes Trantor and dances with him while the mob watches, overloading him with love, and finally kisses his snot-ridden nose, causing Trantor to explode.

With Trantor's destruction, Ernest is proclaimed a hero. Sheriff Binder apologizes to his son for doubting him and Ernest. All of the wooden dolls as well as Rimshot are restored, including those from the early 19th century, and everyone is reunited with their families.

Cast
 Jim Varney as Ernest P. Worrell, Bunny Worrell, Auntie Nelda, and others
 Eartha Kitt as Francis "Old Lady" Hackmore 
 Austin Nagler as Kenny Binder
 Shay Astar as Elizabeth
 Alec Klapper as Joey
 John Cadenhead as Tom Tulip 
 Bill Byrge as Bobby Tulip
 Richard Woolf as Matt Murdock 
 Nick Victory as Mike Murdock 
 Jonas Moscartolo as Trantor
 Ernie Fosselius as Trantor (voice)
 Daniel Butler as Sheriff Cliff Binder 
 Esther Huston as Amanda Binder 
 Larry Black as Mayor Murdock 
 Denice Hicks as Elizabeth's mother
 Jackie Welch as Teacher
 Barkley as Rimshot

Reception
On Rotten Tomatoes the film has a score of 17% based on 6 reviews.
The horror blog A Boos/Booze Situation compared the film to Hocus Pocus which also received a poor box office showing but was cemented as a cult classic. In addition, the blog praised the scene in which a girl discovers the troll in her bed, claiming that it has a strong reputation for terrifying young viewers. Gene Siskel and Roger Ebert reviewed the film on their movie review show “Siskel & Ebert At the Movies”. Both of them gave thumbs down, calling it a film with Jim Varney “mugging his way through a dumb script.”

Ken Hanke of the Mountain Xpress (Asheville, North Carolina) wrote the film was “not good”, but that it was “kind of likable”.

Home media
The film had its first DVD release from Touchstone Home Entertainment on September 3, 2002. Mill Creek Entertainment re-released it on DVD on January 18, 2011, as part of the two-disc set Ernest Triple Feature along with Ernest Goes to Camp and Ernest Goes to Jail. Its third re-release was on May 10, 2011, as an individual film.

References

External links

 
 

1991 films
1990s comedy horror films
1991 fantasy films
1990s monster movies
American children's comedy films
American comedy horror films
American monster movies
Children's horror films
1990s English-language films
Ernest P. Worrell films
American films about Halloween
Films about trolls
Films directed by John R. Cherry III
Puppet films
Films shot in Tennessee
Touchstone Pictures films
1991 comedy films
Films set in Missouri
1990s American films
English-language comedy horror films